Christmas in Brobdingnag, Vol 1 is a short set of Christmas songs infused with the Bards' unique style.  The band kept to their standard autoharp/recorder lineup, creating a "Little Drummer Boy" without drums, and a "Carol of the Bells" without bells. "Bog Down in Christmas" is a holiday parody of the Irish tune "Bog Down in the Valley," which the band performs on its Songs of Ireland album. The album is then finished off with a classic instrumental version of "What Child is This?," and an original comedy song "Christmas Time in Texas."

Track listing 

 "Little Drummer Boy" – 3:20
 "Carol of the Bells" – 1:51
 "Bog Down in Christmas" – 4:41
 "What Child Is This?" – 4:01
 "Christmas Time in Texas" – 4:06

Brobdingnagian Bards albums
2005 EPs
2005 Christmas albums
Christmas albums by American artists
Celtic Christmas albums